The Secret of Treasure Island is a 1938 Columbia movie serial based on the serialized Argosy Magazine story Murder at Pirate Castle (1936). The magazine story was written by L. Ron Hubbard, at the time a writer of pulp fiction  who went on to found the Scientology religion.

The film version is divided into 15 chapters. The serial was well received by fans, and William C. Cline wrote positively of the action sequences in his book In the Nick of Time: Motion Picture Sound Serials.

Plot
The serial is set on a remote island near the Mexican border, where the island's ruthless owner Carter Collins (Walter Miller) holds half of an antique treasure map leading to a cache of gold hidden somewhere on the island. Reporter Larry Kent (Don Terry) arrives on the island in search of another reporter who had gone missing. Local postmaster Toni Morrell (Gwen Gaze) is summoned by Captain Tom Faxton (Warner Richmond) who, on his deathbed, gives Toni the other half of the treasure map, left to her by her father—but Faxton expires before he can divulge the identity of Toni's father. Larry and Toni, besides being opposed by Collins, are threatened by a hoodlum named Gridley (Grant Withers), who disguises in a skull mask and pirate clothing. When the disguise fails, Gridley resorts to desperate means to grab Toni's map, including kidnapping, bombing, vehicular homicide, and attempted murder. Master of the island Collins is equally determined to get the map, using death threats, cannon fire, swordsmen, and enforced suicide. The mysterious Captain Cuttle (George Rosener), an old salt with a hook for a hand, has his own reasons for investigating Captain Faxton's death, and guides Larry and Toni toward the solution of the mystery. Carter Collins finally gains the missing half of the map and locates the "secret of Treasure Island," while the vengeful Gridley sets off explosives to destroy the island's underground tunnels.

Cast
Don Terry as Larry Kent
Gwen Gaze as Toni Morrell
Walter Miller as Carter Collins ("The Shark")
Grant Withers as Roderick Gridley
George Rosener as Capt. Samuel Cuttle
Hobart Bosworth as Dr. X
Sandra Karina as Nurse Zanya
Joe Caits as Salt Water Jerry
Patrick J. Kelly as Professor Gault
Yakima Canutt as Dreer, Leader of the Mole Men, Collins's slave diggers
William Farnum as George Westmore, newspaper editor
Dave O'Brien as Jameson, detective
Warner Richmond as Captain Tom Faxton

Production
Columbia announced plans to distribute the serial in a June 29, 1937 press release describing the studio's 1937-38 program. It was the third serial released by Columbia, and the first of five costume chapter plays. According to Columbia publicists, the story was updated from Robert Louis Stevenson's famous Treasure Island, adapted to fit the time period; L. Ron Hubbard asserted instead that he had adapted the screenplay from his original story Murder at Pirate Castle. An advertisement in the Motion Picture Herald described Hubbard as a "famous action writer, stunt pilot and world adventurer", and stated that he had written an "excitement-jammed yarn with one of the best boxoffice titles in years". After his work on The Secret of Treasure Island, L. Ron Hubbard also helped with the script for the 1941 Columbia movie serial, The Spider Returns.

Columbia assigned staff producer Jack Fier to oversee the Treasure Island project, but the film was actually produced by an independent company, Weiss Brothers. Louis Weiss hired motion picture pioneer Elmer Clifton to direct. Yakima Canutt and Dave O'Brien collaborated on the action sequences. The special effects (including the climactic eruption of a volcano and the destruction of the island) were handled by cameraman Kenneth Peach and explosives expert Earle Bunn.

Action star Don Terry, already under contract to Columbia, was assigned the leading role. The sinister master of the island was originally to be played by Bela Lugosi, who was forced to withdraw after a back injury. He was replaced by veteran serial star Walter Miller.

Reception
The Secret of Treasure Island was well received by fans, and helped to solidify Columbia's presence in the serial marketplace.  William C. Cline described the action in the serial as "well paced and lively". Alan G. Barbour's book Days of Thrills and Adventure described actor Don Terry's performance as "excellent".

Upon completion of the serial, Columbia Pictures ended its affiliation with the Weiss Brothers, opting to make its own serials. The Weiss Brothers were slated to produce The Great Adventures of Wild Bill Hickok, but Columbia took over the production.

The Secret of Treasure Island was highlighted as part of "Serial Fest 2002" in Pennsylvania, which also included serials Batman and Robin, Mysterious Doctor Satan and The Adventures of Rex and Rinty. The serial was shown along with the 1922 Down to the Sea in Ships at the 2006 Memphis Film Festival, and in an article about the festival John Beifuss of The Commercial Appeal called the two serials "Elmer Clifton classics".

Chapter titles
Source
 The Isle of Fear
 The Ghost Talks
 The Phantom Duel
 Buried Alive
 The Girl Who Vanished
 Trapped by the Flood
 The Cannon Roars
 The Circle of Death
 The Pirate's Revenge
 The Crash
 Dynamite
 The Bridge of Doom
 The Mad Flight
 The Jaws of Destruction
 Justice

References

External links

1938 films
1938 adventure films
American black-and-white films
Columbia Pictures film serials
1930s English-language films
Films with screenplays by L. Ron Hubbard
Treasure Island films
Pirate films
Films directed by Elmer Clifton
American adventure films
1930s American films